The Beatles' 1967 album Sgt. Pepper's Lonely Hearts Club Band has a widely recognized album cover that depicts several dozen celebrities and other images. The image was made by posing the Beatles in front of life-sized, black-and-white photographs pasted onto hardboard and hand-tinted.

Concept 
The cover image was created by Jann Haworth and Peter Blake, who in 1967 won the Grammy Award for Best Album Cover, Graphic Arts, for their work on it. Blake has said that the intention was to show a new band surrounded by fans after a performance.

I suggested that they had just played a concert in the park. They were posing for a photograph and the crowd behind them was a crowd of fans who had been at the concert. Having decided on this, then, by making cut-outs, the fans could be anybody, dead or alive, real or fictitious. If we wanted Hansel and Gretel, I could paint them and they could be photographed and blown up. I asked the four Beatles for a list and I did one myself. Robert Fraser did a list and I can't remember whether Brian Epstein did one or not. The way that worked out was fascinating. John gave me a list and so did Paul. George suggested only Indian gurus, about six of them, and Ringo said, "Whatever the others say is fine by me" and didn't suggest anyone. It's an insight into their characters. All kinds of people were suggested. Hitler was there; he is actually in the set-up, but he is covered by the Beatles themselves as we felt he was too controversial. The same applied to Jesus. There were only two of their contemporaries on the cover. Bob Dylan was suggested by John and I put on Dion because he is a great favourite of mine.

People

Top row 

(1) Sri Yukteswar Giri (Hindu guru)
(2) Aleister Crowley (occultist)
(3) Mae West (actress)
(4) Lenny Bruce (comedian)
(5) Karlheinz Stockhausen (composer)
(6) W. C. Fields (comedian/actor)
(7) Carl Jung (psychiatrist)
(8) Edgar Allan Poe (writer)
(9) Fred Astaire (actor/dancer)
(10) Richard Merkin (artist and friend of Peter Blake)
(11) The Vargas Girl (by artist Alberto Vargas)
(12) Leo Gorcey (image was removed from cover, but a space remains)
(13) Huntz Hall (actor)
(14) Simon Rodia (designer and builder of the Watts Towers)
(15) Bob Dylan (singer/songwriter)

Second row 

(16) Aubrey Beardsley (illustrator)
(17) Sir Robert Peel (19th century British Prime Minister)
(18) Aldous Huxley (writer)
(19) Dylan Thomas (poet)
(20) Terry Southern (writer)
(21) Dion DiMucci (singer/songwriter)
(22) Tony Curtis (actor)
(23) Wallace Berman (artist)
(24) Tommy Handley (comedian)
(25) Marilyn Monroe (actress)
(26) William S. Burroughs (writer)
(27) Sri Mahavatar Babaji (Hindu guru)
(28) Stan Laurel (actor/comedian)
(29) Richard Lindner (artist)
(30) Oliver Hardy (actor/comedian)
(31) Karl Marx (political philosopher)
(32) H. G. Wells (writer)
(33) Sri Paramahansa Yogananda (Hindu guru)
(34A) James Joyce (Irish poet and novelist) – barely visible below Bob Dylan
(34) Anonymous (hairdresser's wax dummy)

Third row 

(35) Stuart Sutcliffe (artist/former Beatle)
(36) Anonymous (hairdresser's wax dummy)
(37) Max Miller (comedian)
(38) A "Petty Girl" (by artist George Petty)
(39) Marlon Brando (actor)
(40) Tom Mix (actor)
(41) Oscar Wilde (writer)
(42) Tyrone Power (actor)
(43) Larry Bell (artist)
(44) David Livingstone (missionary/explorer)
(45) Johnny Weissmuller (Olympic swimmer/Tarzan actor)
(46) Stephen Crane (writer) – barely visible between Issy Bonn's head and raised arm
(47) Issy Bonn (comedian)
(48) George Bernard Shaw (playwright)
(49) H. C. Westermann (sculptor)
(50) Albert Stubbins (English footballer)
(51) Sri Lahiri Mahasaya (guru)
(52) Lewis Carroll (writer)
(53) T. E. Lawrence ("Lawrence of Arabia")

Front row 

(54) Wax model of Sonny Liston (boxer)
(55) A "Petty Girl" (by George Petty)
(56) Wax model of George Harrison
(57) Wax model of John Lennon
(58) Shirley Temple (child actress) – barely visible behind the wax models of John and Ringo, first of three appearances on the cover
(59) Wax model of Ringo Starr
(60) Wax model of Paul McCartney
(61) Albert Einstein (physicist) – largely obscured
(62) John Lennon holding a French horn
(63) Ringo Starr holding a trumpet
(64) Paul McCartney holding a cor anglais
(65) George Harrison holding a piccolo
(65A) Bette Davis (actress) – hair barely visible on top of George's shoulder
(66) Bobby Breen (singer)
(67) Marlene Dietrich (actress/singer)
(68) Mahatma Gandhi was planned for this position, but was deleted prior to publication
(69) An American legionnaire
(70) Wax model of Diana Dors (actress)
(71) Shirley Temple (child actress) – second appearance on the cover

Props 
A hookah (water pipe)
A Fukusuke, Japanese figure associated with good luck
A stone figure of Snow White
A baritone horn
A drumhead, designed by fairground artist Joe Ephgrave
An idol of the Hindu goddess Lakshmi
A trophy
An antique stone bust of a Victorian man brought over from John Lennon's house (which provided the basis for the album's cutout portrait of Sgt. Pepper)
A  Sony television set, apparently owned by Paul McCartney (though claimed by Blake to have been Lennon's); the receipt, bearing McCartney's signature, is owned by a curator of a museum dedicated to the Beatles in Japan.
A stone figure of a girl
A ceramic Mexican craft known as a Tree of Life from Metepec, substituted at the request of Germán Valdés, who had been asked to give consent for his image to appear
Cloth grandmother-figure by Jann Haworth
Cloth doll by Haworth of Shirley Temple wearing a sweater that reads "Welcome The Rolling Stones Good Guys" – third and last appearance on the cover
A three-stringed flower guitar
Another stone figure
A garden gnome
A cloth snake
Flowers

Excluded and obscured people 
(12) Leo Gorcey – was modelled and originally included to the left of Huntz Hall, but he was subsequently removed when a fee of $400 ($3,548 in 2020 terms) was requested for the use of the actor's likeness.
(45C) Adolf Hitler – was requested by Lennon and modelled behind the band (to the right of Larry Bell), but was moved out of frame (being "too controversial", according to Blake) and replaced by Johnny Weissmuller. Blake insists that Hitler was hidden behind the band in the final shoot, but this is not apparent from any published photographs showing the nearly complete setup—even in those unobscured by the band.
(54A) Unidentified laughing figure – barely visible
(56A) Sophia Loren (actress) – behind the Beatles' waxworks
(58A) Marcello Mastroianni (actor) – behind the Beatles' waxworks, only the top of the hat is slightly visible
(65B) Timothy Carey (actor) – was modelled and originally included but largely obscured by George Harrison in the final picture
(68) Mahatma Gandhi – was modelled and originally included to the right of Lewis Carroll, but was subsequently removed. According to McCartney, "Gandhi also had to go because the head of EMI, Sir Joe Lockwood, said that in India they wouldn't allow the record to be printed".
Jesus Christ – was requested by Lennon, but he was not modelled because the LP would be released just over a year after Lennon's controversial statement that the band was "more popular than Jesus".

References

Sources

Further reading

External links
 Sgt. Pepper's Lonely Hearts Club Band album at The Beatles' official website 
 Interactive cover at the Oxford Dictionary of National Biography
 Numbered list with graphical reference
 Interactive cover including missing/airbrushed celebrities and static objects
 Interactive cover (2022) with design, people and object descriptions created for the 55th anniversary of the Sgt. Pepper album in cooperation with cover co-designer Jann Haworth.

1967 in art
1967 in music
Lists of 20th-century people
British music-related lists
History of the Beatles
Images of the 20th century
Sgt Pepper's Lonely Hearts Club Band
1967 in British music